Chromolaena hirsuta  is a South American species of flowering shrub in the family Asteraceae. It is native to Brazil, Bolivia, Uruguay, and Argentina.

References

External links
 photo of herbarium specimen at Missouri Botanical Garden, collected in Brazil
 photo of herbarium specimen at Missouri Botanical Garden, collected in Argentina

hirsuta
Flora of South America
Plants described in 1835